Aborolabis angulifera is a species of earwig in the genus Aborolabis, the family Anisolabididae, the suborder Forficulina, and the order Dermaptera. Primarily found in the Afrotropical realm, this species was discovered by Dohrn in 1864.

References 

Anisolabididae
Insects described in 1864